Edward "Ned" Connor (1850 – January 28, 1898) was an American professional baseball player who played one season in the National Association, for the 1871 Troy Haymakers.  He appeared in seven games, and had a .212 batting average in 33 at bats, and scored six runs.  A native of New York, he died in Philadelphia at the age of 47 or 48 of internal hemorrhage, and is interred at Holy Cross Cemetery in Philadelphia.

References

External links

Major League Baseball first basemen
Major League Baseball right fielders
19th-century baseball players
Troy Haymakers players
Baseball players from New York (state)
1850 births
1898 deaths